West Greenlandic, also known as Kalaallisut, is the primary language of Greenland and constitutes the Greenlandic language, spoken by the vast majority of the inhabitants of Greenland, as well as by thousands of Greenlandic Inuit in Denmark proper (in total, approximately 50,000 people). It was historically spoken in the southwestern part of Greenland, i.e. the region around Nuuk.

Tunumiit and Inuktun are the two other native languages of Greenland, spoken by a small minority of the population. Danish remains an important lingua franca in Greenland and used in many parts of public life, as well as being the main language spoken by Danes in Greenland.

An extinct mixed trade language known as West Greenlandic Pidgin was based on West Greenlandic.

References

Greenlandic language
Inuit languages
Languages of Greenland
Indigenous languages of the North American Arctic